Sprekkefjellet is an isolated hill in Antarctica, bearing the appearance of two low rock summits separated by a snow col, located 5 nautical miles (9 km) north of the mouth of Austreskorve Glacier and the main mass of the Muhlig-Hofmann Mountains, in Queen Maud Land. Plotted from surveys and air photos by the Norwegian Antarctic Expedition (1956–60) and named Sprekkefjellet (the split hill).

References

Hills of Queen Maud Land
Princess Astrid Coast